World Film Report is a China daily movie news/variety show broadcast on CCTV-6. It is first global movie industry television program in mainland China.
In 2010, this show honored Media Contribution Award by Republic of Zimbabwe.

Host
 Wang Ningtong
 Ju Wenpei
 Liu Jia

List of Guests
Since its premiere in 2002, the hosts has interviewed entertainers.

Mainland China
(not complete)

Zhang Yimou
Chen Kaige
Feng Xiaogang
He Ping
Gong Li
Zhao Wei
Zhang Ziyi
Zhou Xun
Xu Jinglei
Fan Bingbing
Li Bingbing
Yan Danchen
Chen Kun
Huang Xiaoming
Jet Li

Hong Kong
(not complete)

 Maggie Cheung
 Andy Lau
 Carina Lau
 Ng Man Tat
 Eric Tsang
 Nicholas Tse
 Wong Jing
 Cecilia Cheung
 Stephen Chow
 Twins (band)
 Joey Yung
 Lydia Shum
 Vivian Chow
 Fiona Sit
 Ronald Cheng
 Josie Ho
 Anita Yuen
 Wakin Chau
 Joyce Cheng
 Anthony Wong
 John Woo
 Jacky Cheung
 Jaycee Chan
 Timmy Hung
 Jackie Chan

Taiwan
Li Xing, Hou Hsiao-hsien, Tsai Ming-liang, Ang Lee

Overseas
Luc Besson, Edward Norton, Yoji Yamada, Kang Je-gyu

External links
 Official website 
 CCTV.com

References

Chinese television shows
2010s Chinese television series
2002 Chinese television series debuts
Mandarin-language television shows